The Qayyum Stadium also known as Peshawar Sport Complex is located in Peshawar, the capital of Khyber Pakhtunkhwa province in Pakistan. It is the biggest sports complex in Peshawar and Khyber Pakhtunkhwa. The sport complex has facilities for all major sports including football, field hockey, squash, wrestling and badminton. The sport complex is owned by Government of Khyber Pakhtunkhwa. It has total capacity of 30,000 and it is located within walking distance from Peshawar Saddar and Peshawar Cantonment railway station.

foundation stone laid by Major. General J.Bruce Scott 
                                                   S.B.D.S.O.O.M.C
commander Peshawar are (1943-1946)
The author of the stadium November 1946.The qayyum stadium is also known as Peshawar sports complex is located in Peshawar, the capital of Khyber-Pakhtunkhwa province in Pakistan. It is the biggest sports complex of in Peshawar and Khyber Pakhtunkhwa. The sports complex has facilities for all major sports.
The sport complex is owned by government of Khyber Pakhtunkhwa. It has total capacity of  30,000 and it is located within walking distance from Peshawar saddar and Peshawar cantonment railway station.
Modern automatic feeder ball throwing machines called as training shuttle machines for badminton , table tennis, tennis has been installed in qayyum stadium sports complex Peshawar .      Data submitted by iqra wakeel khan

Sporting Facilities 
Qayyum Stadium currently hold sporting facilities for the following sports.
 Football
 Field Hockey
 Squash
 Wrestling
 Boxing
 Badminton
 Swimming

Notable Events 
Qayyum Stadium has been used for several major events in the past.
 Barcelona Olympics Qualifier Football Match (Pakistan vs Qatar) 1991
 National Games 2010, Peshawar
 All Pakistan Inter-varsity Athletics Championship 2012, Peshawar
 Bacha Khan International Wrestling for Peace Championship 2012, Peshawar
 Wrestling for Peace Festival 2012, Peshawar
 FATA Youth Festival 2015, Peshawar
 2019 PFF National Challenge Cup, Peshawar

Academies & Sports Complexes 
Quyyam Sport Complex currently have the following academies & sports complex.
 Cricket Academy
 Qamar Zaman Squash Complex
 Tennis Academy

See also
 List of stadiums in Pakistan
 Arbab Niaz Stadium
 Peshawar Club Ground
 Hayatabad Sports Complex
 Abdul Wali Khan Sports Complex
 Mardan Sports Complex Pakistan
 Swat Sports Complex

References

Buildings and structures in Peshawar
Badminton venues
Badminton in Pakistan
Sport in Peshawar
Stadiums in Pakistan
Cricket grounds in Pakistan
Sport in Khyber Pakhtunkhwa